The simians, anthropoids, or higher primates are an infraorder (Simiiformes ) of primates containing all animals traditionally called monkeys and apes. More precisely, they consist of the parvorders New World monkeys (Platyrrhini) and Catarrhini, the latter of which consists of the family Cercopithecidae (Old World monkeys in the stricter sense) and the superfamily Hominoidea (apes and – or including – humans).

The simians are sister group to the tarsiers (Tarsiiformes), together forming the haplorhines. The radiation occurred about 60 million years ago (during the Cenozoic era); 40 million years ago, simians colonized South America, giving rise to the New World monkeys. The remaining simians (catarrhines) split about 25 million years ago into Cercopithecidae and apes (including humans).

Taxonomy and evolution
In earlier classification, New World monkeys, Old World monkeys, apes, and humans – collectively known as simians or anthropoids – were grouped under Anthropoidea, while the strepsirrhines and tarsiers were grouped under the suborder "Prosimii". Under modern classification, the tarsiers and simians are grouped under the suborder Haplorhini, while the strepsirrhines are placed in suborder Strepsirrhini. Strong genetic evidence for this is that five SINEs are common to all haplorhines whilst absent in strepsirrhines — even one being coincidental between tarsiers and simians would be quite unlikely. Despite this preferred taxonomic division, "prosimian" is still regularly found in textbooks and the academic literature because of familiarity, a condition likened to the use of the metric system in the sciences and the use of customary units elsewhere in the United States. In the Anthropoidea, evidence indicates that the Old World and New World primates went through parallel evolution.

Primatology, paleoanthropology, and other related fields are split on their usage of the synonymous infraorder names, Simiiformes and Anthropoidea. According to Robert Hoffstetter (and supported by Colin Groves), the term Simiiformes has priority over Anthropoidea because the taxonomic term Simii by van der Hoeven, from which it is constructed, dates to 1833. In contrast, Anthropoidea by Mivart dates to 1864, while Simiiformes by Haeckel dates to 1866, leading to counterclaims of priority. Hoffstetter also argued that Simiiformes is also constructed like a proper infraorder name (ending in "iformes"), whereas Anthropoidea ends in -"oidea", which is reserved for superfamilies. He also noted that Anthropoidea is too easily confused with "anthropoïdes", which translates to "apes" from several languages.

Extant simians are split into two distinct groups. The New World monkeys in parvorder Platyrrhini split from the rest of the simian line about 40 million years ago (Mya), leaving the parvorder Catarrhini occupying the Old World. This latter group split about 25 Mya between the Cercopithecidae and the apes. This shows that the Cercopithecidae are closer related to the apes than to the Platyrrhini.

Some lines of extinct simian also are either placed into the Eosimiidae (to reflect their Eocene origin) and sometimes in Amphipithecidae, thought to originate in the Early Oligocene. Additionally, Phileosimias is sometimes placed in the Eosimiidae and sometimes categorised separately.

Classification

The following is the listing of the various simian families, and their placement in the order Primates:
 Order Primates
 Suborder Strepsirrhini: nontarsier prosimians
 Suborder Haplorhini: tarsiers and monkeys, including apes
 Infraorder Tarsiiformes
Infraorder Simiiformes
 Parvorder Platyrrhini: New World monkeys
 Family Callitrichidae: marmosets and tamarins
 Family Cebidae: capuchins and squirrel monkeys
 Family Aotidae: night or owl monkeys (douroucoulis)
 Family Pitheciidae: titis, sakis, and uakaris
 Family Atelidae: howler, spider, and woolly monkeys
 Parvorder Catarrhini
 Superfamily Cercopithecoidea: Old World monkeys
 Family Cercopithecidae
 Superfamily Hominoidea
 Family Hylobatidae: gibbons
 Family Hominidae: great apes, including humans
 †Amphipithecidae
 †Eosimiidae
 †Aseanpithecus
Below is a cladogram with some of the extinct simian species with the more modern species emerging within the Eosimiidae. The simians originated in Asia, while the crown simians were in Afro-Arabia. It is indicated approximately how many Mya the clades diverged into newer clades.

Usually the Ekgmowechashalidae are considered to be Strepsirrhini, not Haplorhini. A 2018 study places Eosimiidae as a sister to the crown haplorhini. In 2020 papers, the Proteopithecidae are part of the Parapithecoidea, and Nosmips aenigmaticus (previously in Eosimidae) is a basal simian. In a 2021 paper, the following basal simians were found:

{{Clade|{{clade
|label1=(57)
|1={{clade
|1=Altiatlasius koulch (†57)
|label2=(48)
|2=}}
|label2=(56)
|2=
}}|label1=Simiiformes/ (58)|style1=line-height:80%;font-size:80%|sublabel1=Eosimiidae s.l.}}Dolichocebus annectens and Parvimico materdei would normally, given their South American location and their age and other factors, be considered Platyrrhini. The original Eosmiidae appear polyphyletic with Nosmips, Bahinia, and Phileosimias at different locations from other eosimians.

Biological key-features
In a section of their 2010 assessment of the evolution of anthropoids (simians) entitled "What is an Anthropoid", Williams, Kay, and Kirk set out a list of biological features common to all or most anthropoids, including genetic similarities, similarities in eye location and the muscles close to the eyes, internal similarities between ears, dental similarities, and similarities on foot bone structure. The earliest anthropoids were small primates with varied diets, forward-facing eyes, acute color vision for daytime lifestyles, and brains devoted more to vision and less to smell. Living simians in both the New World and the Old World have larger brains than other primates, but they evolved these larger brains independently.

See also
 Simia'', Carl Linnaeus's original classification of these primates.
 wikt:simianization

References

External links
 BioMed Central Full text Gene conversion and purifying selection of a placenta-specific ERV-V envelope gene during simian evolution
 ADW Simiiformes Classification
 Taxonomy browser (Simiiformes)
 Late middle Eocene epoch of Libya yields earliest known radiation of African anthropoids
 Mouse-Sized Primates Shed Light on Human Origins

Primate taxonomy